Tetraneuris, commonly known as four-nerve daisy or bitterweed, is a genus of North American plants in the sneezeweed tribe within the daisy family.

The genus includes one annual, Tetraneuris linearifolia, with all the other species being perennials.

The name is of Greek origin, tetra, four and neuron, nerve, referring to the venation of the rays, which are three-lobed with the outer lobes themselves having an apparent vein down the middle.

 Species
 Tetraneuris acaulis - western Canada, western USA, northern Mexico
 Tetraneuris argentea - Arizona New Mexico 
 Tetraneuris herbacea - Ontario Michigan Ohio Illinois 
 Tetraneuris ivesiana - Utah Colorado New Mexico Arizona 
 Tetraneuris linearifolia - Tamaulipas, Coahuila, Nuevo León, Kansas Oklahoma Texas New Mexico 
 Tetraneuris scaposa - Chihuahua, Tamaulipas, Coahuila, Nuevo León, San Luis Potosí, Zacatecas, Nebraska Kansas Oklahoma Texas Colorado New Mexico 
 Tetraneuris torreyana - Arizona New Mexico Utah Colorado Wyoming Montana
 Tetraneuris turneri - Coahuila, Texas
 Tetraneuris verdiensis - Arizona

 formerly included
see Hymenoxys 
 Tetraneuris brandegeei  - Hymenoxys brandegeei 
 Tetraneuris grandiflora  - Hymenoxys grandiflora

References

 
Asteraceae genera
Flora of North America
Taxa named by Edward Lee Greene